Minister of Social Development can refer to:
 Minister of Social Development (Canada)
 Minister of Social Development (South Africa)
 Minister for Social Development (New Zealand)

See also
 Ministry of Social Development (disambiguation)